Ministry of Research and Technology of the Republic of Indonesia  (abbrievated as Kemenristek, or RISTEK-BRIN on its logo) was a government ministry that has the task of conducting affairs in the field of research, science and technology to assist the President of Indonesia in carrying out state. The ministry was formerly known as the Ministry of Research, Technology and Higher Education of the Republic of Indonesia.

History
Founded in 1962 under the name National Research Affairs Ministry of the Republic of Indonesia, and in 1973 changed its name to the Ministry of Research. Year 1986-2001 as Minister of State for Research and Technology, and in 2002 according Circular Minister of State for Administrative Reform concerning Naming Government Agencies, Office of the Secretary of State referred to the Ministry of Research and Technology. In 2005 pursuant to Presidential Decree No. 9 In 2005, this institution called the Ministry of Research and Technology (KNRT) or as the State Ministry of Research and Technology. In 2009 pursuant to Presidential Decree 47 of 2009 referred to the Ministry of Research and Technology.

In Working Cabinet in 2014, Directorate General of Higher Education, previously under Ministry of Education, was merged into Ministry of Research & Technology. However, in Onward Indonesia Cabinet, the ministry later reverted to its original form as Ministry of Research and Technology in pursuant of Presidential Decision No. 113/P/2019  and Presidential Decree No. 73/2019, while Higher Education returned again to Ministry of Education and Culture (Indonesia) according to Presidential Decree No. 72/2019  In addition, this ministry also included a new agency, National Research and Innovation Agency, which established by Presidential Decree No. 74/2019, resulting the minister also has role as the Head of National Research and Innovation Agency.

On 9 April 2021, People's Representative Council approved that this ministry is merged with the Ministry of Education and Culture to form the Ministry of Education, Culture, Research and Technology, while National Research and Innovation Agency separated to a new non-ministerial government agency. At the same time, Bambang Brodjonegoro announced his departure in one event at Hasanuddin University told the audience the visit will be the last event he attended on his capacity as the Minister and Head of BRIN. On 10 April 2021, Bambang Brodjonegoro reported resigned from his positions as the Minister and Head of BRIN. On 28 April 2021, Nadiem Makarim inaugurated as the new minister for Ministry of Education, Culture, Research and Technology, and Laksana Tri Handoko appointed as new Head of National Research and Innovation Agency, effectively ending the ministry.

Logo

Function

Formulate and establish policies in the field of research and technology
Coordinate and synchronize policies in the field of research and technology
Manage of property/wealth of the country is the responsibility of the Ministry of Research and Technology
Oversight of the implementation of the tasks of the Ministry of Research and Technology

Organization Structure
Prior its disbandment, based on its last constituting document, Presidential Decree No. 73/2019, and amended with Presidential Decree No. 94/2019, the minister's office is quite simple and minimalist, unlike its form during its time as Ministry of Research, Technology, and Higher Education. Much of its directorates originally placed to the ministry were placed in National Research and Innovation Agency. 
Office of The Minister of Research and Technology
Ministerial General Secretariat
Senior Advisor in Infrastructure
Senior Advisor in Research Relevance and Productivity
The National Research and Innvovation Agency, based on its last constituting document, Presidential Decree No. 74/2019, and amended with Presidential Decree No. 95/2019, consisted of:

 Office of The Head of National Research and Innovation Agency
 Senior Advisers
 Agency Secretariat
 Office of the Deputy Head in Strengthening Research and Development 
 Directorate of Research and Development System
 Directorate of Research and Community Service
 Directorate of Industrial Technology Development
 Directorate of Intellectual Property Management
 Office of the Deputy Head in Strengthening Innovation
 Directorate of Innovation System
 Directorate of Technology-based Startup Companies
 Directorate of Industrial Innovation
 Office of General Inspectorate

Coordination
During its existence, based on Presidential Decree No. 4 of 2003 on the co-ordination of formulation, Strategic Policy Development and Implementation of National Science and Technology, the Ministry of Research and Technology is operationally responsible for coordination with the following governmental non-ministerial agencies:
 Indonesian Institute of Sciences (LIPI)
 National Institute of Aeronautics and Space (LAPAN)
 Agency for the Assessment and Application of Technology (BPPT)
 National Nuclear Energy Agency (BATAN)
 Nuclear Energy Regulatory Agency (BAPETEN)
 Coordination Agency for Surveys and Mapping (BAKOSURTANAL)
 National Standardization Agency (BSN)

Ministry of Research and Technology also co-ordinate, and manage institutions as follows:
 Research Center for Science and Technology (PUSPIPTEK) Serpong
 Eijkman Institute for Molecular Biology or Eijkman (LBME)
 Science and Technology Demonstration Center (PUSPA Science and Technology)
 Agro Techno Park (ATP) Palembang
 Business Technology Center (BTC)
 Bio Island
 Agribusiness

List of Ministers

References

Research, Technology and Higher Education
Indonesia
Indonesia
Central Jakarta
Government agencies established in 1962
1962 establishments in Indonesia